Cetriporis (also known as Ketriporis, an anthroponym from the Thracian language) was a king of the Odrysian kingdom in western Thrace from c. 356 BC, in succession to his father Berisades, with whom he may already have been a co-ruler. He is most known for entering into an alliance with Athens, the Illyrians, and the Paeonians against Philip II of Macedonia  in the summer of 356 BC, negotiated by his brother Mononius. As king, Cetriporis controlled only part of the Odrysian kingdom, the remainder being in the possession of the rival Odrysian kings Amadocus II and Cersobleptes. 

After his father died, Cetriporis and his brothers were in conflict with Cersobleptes, who had declared war and plotted with the mercenary general Charidemus to eliminate Cetriporis and Amadocus as rival kings. Around the same time he was part of the coalition against Philip; however, Philip defeated the coalition between 356 and 352 BC. Cetriporis himself appears to have been subjected by Philip early, at which time the mines he possessed passed under the control of the Macedonian ruler.

Honours
Ketripor Hill in Antarctica is named after Cetriporis.

Notes

References
Hammond, N. G. L.; "Philip's Actions in 347 and Early 346 B.C." in Classical Quarterly, v. 44 (1994), pp. 367–374.
Smith, William; Dictionary of Greek and Roman Biography and Mythology, "Berisades", Boston (1867).

4th-century BC rulers
Odrysian kings